Ravi Bahadur Rana (born 15 October 2002), is an Indian professional footballer who plays as a midfielder or winger for ATK Mohun Bagan in the Indian Super League.

Club career
Born in Jammu Kashmir Ravi started his career by joining Tata football academy in Jamshedpur. He is first player from Jammu Kashmir to join TFA.↵Over the years he promoted from Jamshedpur U-18 to Jamshedpur B team.
In 2021 Ravi Rana joined ATK Mohun Bagan FC and was included in their squad in AFC Cup.
He made his debut in Indian Super League in 89th minute as the come for replacement of Manvir Singh.

International career
In July 2017, Ravi was selected in India U-16 team. He scored a hat-trick in SAFF U-15 Championship against Maldives. He also scored u19 saff cup final goal history first time india won u19 saff cup.

Career statistics

Club

References

External links
 AIFF profile
 

2002 births
Living people
People from Jammu (city)
Footballers from Jammu and Kashmir
Indian footballers
India youth international footballers
Association football defenders
ATK Mohun Bagan FC players